The Rebel Outlaw: Josey Wales is a 1973 American Western novel (also titled Gone to Texas in later editions) written by Asa Earl Carter (under the pen name Forrest Carter). It was adapted into the film The Outlaw Josey Wales directed by and starring Clint Eastwood. The novel was republished in 1975 under the title Gone to Texas.

Wales was portrayed by Michael Parks in the 1986 sequel to the film The Return of Josey Wales.

Plot
Josey Wales, a Missouri farmer, seeks vengeance when his family is murdered by a gang of Unionists during the American Civil War by joining a band of Confederate guerrillas. At the war's end, he refuses to surrender to the victorious Northern forces and instead becomes an outlaw. He then sets out to make a new life for himself, all while trying to outrun the men seeking to hunt him down.

References

American novels adapted into films
English-language novels
Western (genre) novels
1972 American novels
1972 debut novels
Novels set during the American Civil War